Lichenopeltella santessonii is a species of lichenicolous fungus belonging to the class Dothideomycetes. It was first formally described as a new species of Micropeltopsis in 1990 by mycologists Paul Kirk and Brian Spooner. The specific epithet honours Swedish lichenologist Rolf Santesson, who collected the type specimen in Sala Municipality, Sweden, where it was growing on the foliose lichen Peltigera canina. Santesson transferred the taxon to the genus Lichenopeltella in 1993.

It has only been reported from a few countries in the northern hemisphere and is considered to be a rare species. It is known to grow on the lichen Peltigera aphthosa near Svartifoss in Iceland.

References

Microthyriales
Fungi described in 1990
Fungi of Europe
Fungi of Iceland
Lichenicolous fungi